Verkh-Bekhtemir is a rural locality (a selo) and the administrative center of Verkh-Bekhtemirsky Selsoviet of Biysky District, Altai Krai, Russia. The population was 979 as of 2016. There are 11 streets.

Geography 
Verkh-Bekhtemir is located on the bank of the Bekhtemir River, 60 km northeast of Biysk (the district's administrative centre) by road. Shebalino is the nearest rural locality.

Ethnicity 
The village is inhabited by Russians and others.

References 

Rural localities in Biysky District